Gogar is a town in Egypt, located in the governorate of Dakahlia.

References 

Cities in Egypt
Populated places in Dakahlia Governorate